Suri Sadar Hospital is a district hospital situated at  Suri, the District Headquarters of Birbhum district, India. It is also one of the three super-specialty hospitals built in Birbhum district. Apart from people of  Suri, people of neighbouring villages and towns (such as,  Rajnagar,  Mohammad Bazar, Purandarpur, Sainthia etc.) and even the people of neighbouring state Jharkhand also depend on this hospital.

The total number of beds in this hospital is 520. During the 2020 COVID-19 pandemic, a coronavirus testing laboratory was established at the Suri Sadar Hospital.

References 

Hospitals in West Bengal
Year of establishment missing